DuPont State Recreational Forest, commonly known as DuPont Forest, is a  state forest, located in Henderson and Transylvania counties of North Carolina. The name originates from the fact that the DuPont company arranged the sale of the original tract to the state. Adjacent tracts have since been purchased and added to the state forest. Portions of the forest formerly contained a manufacturing facility for the production of X-ray film. The forest was used to shoot scenes from the 1992 film The Last of the Mohicans as well as the 2012 box office hit The Hunger Games. On February 12, 2019, the forest added  from Conserving Carolina, part of a section called the Continental Divide Tract that connects with other public lands. 314 more acres was added to the forest in 2019.

History 
Before 1996, the area that is DuPont state forest today, Buck Forest, was owned by Dupont, who ran a plant on the property, until it was sold to Sterling Diagnostic Imaging. The remainder of the land was sold to the state of North Carolina, which created DuPont State Forest. However, the original state forest was much smaller than it is today. Later, in 2000, 500 acres were added to the forest.

In 1999, Sterling held a private bid for 2,223 out of the 2,700 acres the company had acquired. The state and several conservation groups tried to obtain it, but were unsuccessful.

The property was eventually acquired by a developer named Jim Anthony. When the property was sold, Sterling prohibited the land from being used for private development. Anthony stated that he was not planning to develop the property, even though it was obvious based on the improvements he was making to the property. The conservation groups also learned around this time that the restrictions were unenforceable, and that the Landowner could do whatever they wanted with the land.

Despite the efforts of the conservation groups, Anthony continued to develop the property, and eventually divided it into lots. Following this, on October 23, 2000, Governor Jim Hunt and the North Carolina Council of State voted to condemn the property.  The state paid Anthony $24 million USD for the property, then it was absorbed into DuPont State Forest.

In 2019, Conserving Carolina gave the forest several hundred acres of land in the continental divide tract.

Recreation
Nearly  of multi-use trails and roads thread through the forest. The forest is widely used for many recreational activities, including mountain biking, hiking, horseback riding, swimming (where permitted), wading, and kayaking. Destinations include mountaintop views (such as from the summit of Stone Mountain, and Cedar Rock), lakes (such as Lake Imaging, Lake Julia, Lake Dense, and Fawn Lake), and waterfalls, including:
 Bridal Veil Falls
 Grassy Creek Falls
 High Falls
 Hooker Falls
 Triple Falls
 Wintergreen Falls

Popular mountain biking trails include Ridgeline, Big Rock, Cedar Rock, and Airstrip trails. The Airstrip trail starts from near a small unused (or emergency use) airplane landing area. The Ridgeline trail is particularly noted for its long continuous, winding and uninterrupted run, with a mild downhill grade.

Nearby state parks
The following state parks and state forests are within  of DuPont State Recreational Forest:
 Caesars Head State Park (South Carolina)
 Chimney Rock State Park (North Carolina)
 Devils Fork State Park (South Carolina)
 Gorges State Park (North Carolina)
 Headwaters State Forest (North Carolina)
 Holmes Educational State Forest (North Carolina)
 Horsepasture State Natural River (North Carolina)
 Jones Gap State Park (South Carolina)
 Keowee-Toxaway State Park (South Carolina)
 Paris Mountain State Park (South Carolina)
 Pisgah View State Park (North Carolina)
 Poe Creek State Forest (South Carolina)
 Table Rock State Park (South Carolina)

See also 
 Pisgah National Forest (also popular in western North Carolina for hiking and mountain biking)
 Holmes Educational State Forest (Managed by DuPont State Recreational Forest)

References

External links 
 
 Friends of DuPont Forest website

 
North Carolina state forests
State forests of the Appalachians
Protected areas of Henderson County, North Carolina
Protected areas of Transylvania County, North Carolina
Mountain biking in the United States
Protected areas established in 1997
1997 establishments in North Carolina